The 1972 New Mexico State Aggies football team was an American football team that represented New Mexico State University in the Missouri Valley Conference during the 1972 NCAA University Division football season. In their fifth year under head coach Jim Wood, the Aggies compiled a 2–9 record. The team played its home games at Memorial Stadium in Las Cruces, New Mexico.

Schedule

Notes

References

New Mexico State
New Mexico State Aggies football seasons
New Mexico State Aggies football